Harpreet Sandhu (born 8 January 1979) is an Indian actor, director, writer, music director, editor, cinematographer and poet. His debut Punjabi film Work Weather Wife was the first ever Punjabi and only Canadian film to get shortlisted at 87th Academy Awards under Best Original Song in a feature film and Best Feature Film for its songs "Moon" and "Long Braid".

Early life 
Sandhu was born in Rurka Kalan, Punjab, India and spent the early part of his life living in a remote village. He is a graduate of Khalsa College, Amritsar and he trained under Hollywood actress Debra Podowski in Vancouver, British Columbia, Canada.

Professional work 
Sandhu is an actor and film maker. His debut film is Work Weather Wife in 2014. He has worked with Alka Yagnik. He has acted in Indian and international films. He dubbed Wahgan Hawaawan, in Urdu for ArtGauge Films Inc. and scripted the Urdu version of poems for Work Weather Wife.

He has been associated with advertising since 2009 as a model, choreographer, copywriter, producer and director.

Filmography

Awards and nominations 
On March 19, 2015, Sandhu was nominated for Canadian Immigrant Award, recognizing the top 25 Canadian immigrants of the year, sponsored by RBC.
 Won: Los Angeles Movie Awards for Judaaiyaan: The Separation (2011)
 Won: Toronto Independent Film Festival: Judaaiyaan: The Separation (2011)
 Won: Los Angeles Reel Film Festival: Judaaiyaan: The Separation (2011) – As producer

References

External links 

Film directors from Punjab, India
Indian male film actors
Male actors in Hindi cinema
Living people
1979 births
Film producers from Punjab, India
Male actors from Punjab, India